M.S.K. Bhavani Rajenthiran (born 10 December 1954) was a member of the 14th Lok Sabha of India. She was born in Tirumangalam, Madurai to the Tirumangalam'sEx MLA, M. C. A. Rethinasamy thevar. She represented the Ramanthapuram constituency of Tamil Nadu and is a member of the Dravida Munnetra Kazhagam (DMK) political party.

References

Living people
Indian Tamil people
Lok Sabha members from Tamil Nadu
1954 births
India MPs 2004–2009
Women in Tamil Nadu politics
Dravida Munnetra Kazhagam politicians
People from Ramanathapuram district
21st-century Indian women politicians
21st-century Indian politicians
Women members of the Lok Sabha